Pedro León Sánchez Gil (born 24 November 1986), known as León, is a Spanish professional footballer who plays as a right winger for Real Murcia.

After making a name for himself at Valladolid and Getafe, he transferred to Real Madrid in 2010. He left after a sole season troubled by problems with the management, going on to represent Getafe and Eibar also in La Liga and make 346 appearances in the competition (43 goals scored).

A Spain under-21 international, León represented the nation at the 2009 European Championship.

Club career

Murcia
Born in Mula, Region of Murcia, León began playing with local Muleño CF and Nueva Vanguardia's youth teams, eventually moving in early 2004 to Real Murcia to finish his youth career.

After a spell with the B team, he made his official debut with the main squad on 15 January 2005, in a Segunda División 5–1 loss away loss against UE Lleida, going on to play a further six matches during the season and scoring in a 3–1 win at neighbouring Ciudad de Murcia.

The following two seasons, León became an integral player for Murcia, netting seven goals in the 2006–07 campaign, several from free kicks, as the side returned to La Liga after a three-year absence. In January 2007, he was rumoured to be moving to Real Madrid or Chelsea, being speculated that the latter would buy him for £3.4 million.

Levante
Despite all transfer rumours, León joined modest Levante UD in the 2007 summer for £2.5 million after rejecting an offer from to renew his contract for €1 million, in a move the club found quite offensive. He often underachieved in 2007–08, starting only 11 times from 24 appearances as Levante returned to the second tier. He also ended up training alone, due to problems with management and teammates alike.

Valladolid
On 13 September 2008, Real Valladolid bought León for €300,000 after a quick negotiation. Soon becoming first choice, he provided his first assist for Fabián Canobbio on 15 November in a 1–0 home victory over Real Madrid, netting his first for the club a week later in a 3–0 away defeat of Villarreal CF.

Getafe
After lengthy negotiations with Getafe CF, with the player appearing very rarely for Valladolid in pre-season, a five-year contract worth around €4 million was finally arranged in August 2009. León scored nine goals in all competitions during the season (eight in the league, with nine assists), as the Madrilenians finished sixth and qualified for the UEFA Europa League for the second time in their history.

Real Madrid
On 15 July 2010, Real Madrid confirmed the transfer of León for €10 million. The player passed the pertinent medical test and was presented the following day. He made his debut on 4 August in a friendly with Club América, playing the full match in a 3–2 win. In his second appearance, four days later, he scored against the LA Galaxy as the match ended with the same score.

León scored his first competitive goal on 3 November 2010, combining with Karim Benzema – both players had come from the bench during the second half – for a last-minute goal at A.C. Milan in the group stage of the UEFA Champions League, a 2–2 draw that sent the Spaniards through to the knockout stage. During the course of the league campaign, however, he appeared rarely: after assuming he would start against AJ Auxerre in the Champions League in late September, he was immediately dropped from the list of 18 by coach José Mourinho. Later, he was ridiculed in the press by his own manager when the latter justified his absence. In early February 2011, both he and teammate Fernando Gago were dropped from the squad that would face Sevilla FC in the semi-finals of the Copa del Rey, for fighting in training; Gago was however picked for the next match, whereas León was not.

Chelsea renewed their interest in taking León on loan in the winter transfer window, but no move took place – he reportedly blamed Mourinho for blocking the move. In March 2011, after the market had closed, Hércules CF tried to acquire the player on loan following Tote's severe knee injury, but Real Madrid refused again.

Getafe return
At the end of the 2011 summer transfer window, León returned to former club Getafe on a season-long loan. He scored the first goal of his second spell on 1 October, with a spectacular long-range strike at Málaga CF in a 3–2 loss. The move was extended for the following campaign.

Subsequently, León signed for Getafe on a permanent basis. On 6 October 2013, he scored twice in a 3–1 home win over Real Betis, his first coming through a 40-meter free kick.

León was not allowed to be registered for the start of 2014–15, as the club had exceeded the €17 million salary cap. The situation was finally resolved on 24 November, the day of his 28th birthday.

Eibar
On 5 July 2016, after Getafe's relegation, León signed a two-year deal with SD Eibar also in the top flight. He scored a career-best ten goals in his first season – only behind Sergi Enrich's 11 in the squad– but missed the vast majority of the following after replapsing from a left-knee injury.

Fuenlabrada
After Eibar's relegation, León agreed to a one-year contract with CF Fuenlabrada of the second division on 1 August 2021. He scored a squad-best ten goals in his only season (seven from penalties), but his team went down as second-bottom.

International career
León made his debut for the Spain national under-21 team on 31 January 2007. On 6 February, Iñaki Sáez played him again in a friendly with England, in which he was replaced by Juan Mata in a 2–2 away draw. He also featured in the 2009 European Championship qualifier against Georgia, coming on for Alejandro Alfaro in the second half a 1–0 away win.

Picked in the 23-man squad for the final stages in Sweden, León scored in the final game against Finland, but the nation did not progress from the group stage.

Personal life
León's older brother, Luis León Sánchez, is a road bicycle racer. His other brother Antonio also played football, but the indoor variety.

León was not his surname, but he carried it as a middle name in memory of his grandfather and eldest brother, who both died in 2006 (the latter in a motorbike accident), and tended to just go by the name León rather than León Sánchez (as his two brothers), also celebrating his goals by pointing to the sky.

Career statistics

Honours
Real Madrid
Copa del Rey: 2010–11

References

External links

1986 births
Living people
People from Río Mula
Spanish footballers
Footballers from the Region of Murcia
Association football wingers
La Liga players
Segunda División players
Tercera División players
Primera Federación players
Real Murcia Imperial players
Real Murcia players
Levante UD footballers
Real Valladolid players
Getafe CF footballers
Real Madrid CF players
SD Eibar footballers
CF Fuenlabrada footballers
Spain under-21 international footballers